A streetcar suburb is a residential community whose growth and development was strongly shaped by the use of streetcar lines as a primary means of transportation. Such suburbs developed in the United States in the years before the automobile, when the introduction of the electric trolley or streetcar allowed the nation’s burgeoning middle class to move beyond the central city’s borders.  Early suburbs were served by horsecars, but by the late 19th century cable cars and electric streetcars, or trams, were used, allowing residences to be built farther away from the urban core of a city. Streetcar suburbs, usually called additions or extensions at the time, were the forerunner of today's suburbs in the United States and Canada. San Francisco's Western Addition is one of the best examples of streetcar suburbs before westward and southward expansion occurred.

Although most closely associated with the electric streetcar, the term can be used for any suburb originally built with streetcar-based transit in mind, thus some streetcar suburbs date from the early 19th century. As such, the term is general and one development called a streetcar suburb may vary greatly from others. However, some concepts are generally present in streetcar suburbs, such as straight (often gridiron) street plans and relatively narrow lots.

Similar terms

Railroad suburbs

By 1830, many New York City area commuters were going to work in Manhattan from what are now the boroughs of Brooklyn and Queens, which were not part of New York City at that time. They commuted by ferries. In 1852, architect Alexander Jackson Davis designed Llewellyn Park in New Jersey, a planned suburb served by both ferry and steam railroad. In the 1840s and 1850s, new railroad lines fostered the development of such New York City suburbs as Yonkers, White Plains, and New Rochelle. The steam locomotive in the mid 19th century provided the wealthy with the means to live in bucolic surroundings, to socialize in country clubs and still commute to work downtown. These suburbs were what historian Kenneth T. Jackson called the "railroad suburbs" and historian Robert Fishman called a "bourgeois utopia".

Outside of Philadelphia, suburbs like Radnor, Bryn Mawr, and Villanova developed along the Philadelphia Main Line. As early as 1850, 83 commuter stations had been built within a 15-mile radius of Boston. Chicago saw huge developments, with 11 separate lines serving over 100 communities by 1873. A famous community served was Riverside, Illinois, arguably one of the first planned communities in the United States, designed in 1869 by Frederick Law Olmsted.

Horsecar and cable car suburbs

However, the suburbs closest to the city were based on horsecars and eventually cable cars. First introduced to America around 1830, the horse-drawn omnibus was revolutionary because it was the first mass transit system, offering regularly scheduled stops along a fixed route, allowing passengers to travel three miles sitting down in the time it would take them to walk two miles. Later more efficient horse-drawn streetcars allowed cities to expand to areas even more distant. By 1860, they operated in most major American and Canadian cities, including New York, Baltimore, Philadelphia, Chicago, Cincinnati, Saint Louis, Montreal, and Boston.

Horsecar suburbs emanated from the city center towards the more distant railroad suburbs. For the first time, transportation began to separate social and economic classes in cities, as the working and middle class continued to live in areas closer to the city center, while the rich could afford to live farther out.

History

Development
The introduction of the electrical streetcar in Richmond, Virginia, in 1887 by Frank J. Sprague marked the start of a new era of transportation-influenced suburbanization through the birth of the "streetcar suburb". The early trolley allowed people to effortlessly travel in 10 minutes what they could walk in 30, and was rapidly introduced in cities like Boston and Los Angeles, and eventually to all larger American and Canadian cities. There were 5,783 miles of streetcar track serving American cities in 1890; this grew to 22,000 by 1902 and 34,404 by 1907.

By 1890, electric streetcar lines were replacing horse-drawn ones in cities of all sizes, allowing the lines to be extended and fostering a tremendous amount of suburban development. They were often extended out to formerly rural communities, which experienced an initial surge of development, and then new residential corridors were created along the newly built lines leading to what had sometimes been separate communities. On side streets, the houses closest to the original streetcar line are often as much as ten to twenty years older than houses built farther down the street, reflecting the initial surge and slow completion of a development.

Because streetcar operators offered low fares and free transfers, commuting was finally affordable to nearly everyone. Combined with the relatively cheap cost of land farther from the city, streetcar suburbs were able to attract a broad mix of people from all socioeconomic classes, although they were most popular by far with the middle class.

The houses in a streetcar suburb were generally narrow in width compared to later homes, and Arts and Crafts movement styles like the California Bungalow and American Foursquare were most popular. These houses were typically purchased by catalog and many of the materials arrived by railcar, with some local touches added as the house was assembled. The earliest streetcar suburbs sometimes had more ornate styles, including late Victorian and Stick. The houses of streetcar suburbs, whatever the style, tended to have prominent front porches, while driveways and built-in garages were rare, reflecting the pedestrian-focused nature of the streets when the houses were initially built. Setbacks between houses were not nearly as small as in older neighborhoods (where they were sometimes nonexistent), but houses were still typically built on lots no wider than 30 to 40 feet.

Shops such as groceries, bakeries, and drug stores were usually built near the intersection of streetcar lines, or directly along more heavily traveled routes (otherwise, routes would simply be lined with houses similar to those found in the surrounding neighborhoods). These shops would sometimes be multi-story buildings, with apartments on the upper floors. These provided convenient shopping for household supplies for the surrounding neighborhoods, which could potentially be visited on one's way to or from work. While there were stores near houses, they were not quite as close as in older parts of cities, and they were usually confined to specific streets, representing the beginning of a complete separation between residential and commercial areas in cities.

Unlike railroad suburbs, which tended to form in pockets around stations along the interurban line, streetcar suburbs formed continuous corridors stretching outwards from city cores. The streetcar lines themselves were either built on roads that conformed to the grid, or on former turnpikes radiating in all directions from the city, sometimes giving such cities a roughly star-like appearance on maps. Along the lines, developers built rectangular "additions" with homes, usually on small lots, within a five- to ten-minute walk of the streetcar. These were essentially built on the grid plan of the older central cities, and typically spread out in between streetcar lines throughout a city.

Streetcar use continued to increase until 1923 when patronage reached 15.7 billion, but it declined in every year after that as automobile use increased amongst the middle and upper classes. By the 1930s, the once-profitable streetcar companies were diversifying by adding motorized buses and trackless trolleys to their fleets. By the 1940s, streetcar ridership had dropped dramatically, and few subdivisions were being built with streetcars or mass transit in general in mind. By the 1950s, nearly all streetcar lines had stopped running, and were instead served by buses.

Modern streetcar suburbs

Now somewhat urban in appearance, former streetcar suburbs are readily recognizable by the neighborhood structure along and near the route. Every few blocks, or along the entire route in well-preserved neighborhoods, there are small commercial structures, storefronts usually flush with the sidewalk; these were small stores—often groceries—operated by "mom and pop" operators who lived in quarters behind or above the establishment. Off-street parking, if it exists at all, is in the rear of the building.

Because stores were originally built along streetcar lines, a person could exit the transport near home, do some light shopping for dinner items, and continue by walking to his or her residence. These buildings also provided shopping for a non-employed spouse. Very few small groceries remain (outside of dense cities), though the space is often now used for non-foodstuff retail, capable of drawing clients from outside of the immediate neighborhood.

Modern streetcar suburbs are usually served by buses which run roughly the original streetcar routes, and may offer highly reasonable mass transit commute times to downtowns and other business areas, especially compared to later automobile suburbs.  Toronto, Ontario, Canada is an example of a city in which most streetcar suburbs are still served by streetcars.

House prices in streetcar suburbs vary by neighborhood and city. Lots left empty in these areas during initial development, or where the initial houses have burned or been torn down, are usually too narrow for modern residential zoning regulations, meaning that it is difficult to infill housing in well-preserved streetcar suburbs. Occasionally two lots are combined into one for a wide enough lot, or many houses are torn down for a new use as needed.  However, in some cases where historic zoning applies, infill housing is encouraged or required to match neighboring housing standards.

Features

In a greater sense, the streetcar suburbs of the early 20th century worked well for a variety of reasons.

 While most cities grew in a piecemeal fashion, without any real plan for future development, streetcar suburbs were highly planned communities that were organized under single ownership and control. Indeed, they would often be the first such developments in their respective cities.
 Most lots in streetcar suburbs were quite small by post-World War II suburban standards, allowing for a compact and walkable neighborhood, as well as convenient access to public transport (the streetcar line).
 Most streetcar suburbs were laid out in a grid plan, although designers of these suburbs often modified the grid pattern to suit the site context with curvilinear streets.  Additionally, most of these pre-automobile suburbs included alleys with a noticeable absence of front-yard driveways.
 In terms of transportation, the streetcar provided the primary means for residents to get to work, shopping, and social activities. Yet, at either end of the streetcar trip, walking remained as the primary means of getting around. As a result, even in these early suburbs, the overall city remained very pedestrian friendly. This was not always the case for other vehicles. At the turn of the 20th century, the bicycle was also a popular form of mobility for many urban dwellers of the era.  (However, when the streetcar rail tracks were encased in the asphalt of a street the resulting trench, for the flanges of the steel wheels, created a dangerous hazard for cyclists, being big enough to trap bicycle wheels but not large enough to get out of easily.)
 Because of the pedestrian-oriented nature of these communities, sidewalks were necessary in order to avoid an unacceptable and muddy walk to the streetcar on an unpaved street. Trees lining the streets were also seen as critical to a healthy and attractive neighborhood. While such developments often occurred on farmland or other cleared sites, the evidence of the street trees planted can be seen today in the large, overarching canopies found in these attractive post-turn-of-the-20th-century communities.

Examples of streetcar suburbs in North America

Atlanta
Adair Park started developing in the 1890s as an all-white streetcar suburb and is now a majority-black area, with strong community commitment to preservation. The Wren's Nest, the home of Joel Chandler Harris, the writer of the Uncle Remus stories, can be visited here.
Inman Park is listed on the National Register of Historic Places and became Atlanta's first streetcar suburb in 1889. The trolley line is gone, but the trolley barn is still standing, renovated
Virginia Highland developed starting in 1911, located at the end of Atlanta's legendary Nine-Mile Circle trolley line
Kirkwood was founded in 1899 as an independent city, which grew around a streetcar line between Atlanta and Decatur

Austin
Hyde Park in Austin, Texas, traces its origins back to 1891 and is considered to be Austin's first suburb. The neighborhood was originally developed by Monroe Martin Shipe in 1891 as a "white only" streetcar suburb with a large artificial lake, but it has since become one of the most densely populated areas in the city's urban core.

Baltimore
Roland Park

Boston
Roxbury
Dorchester
Brighton became a streetcar suburb when transit lines were laid in 1889.
Roslindale
Brookline
Somerville was studied with respect to the social mobility in streetcar suburbs.
Classic book on the topic in Boston: Sam Bass Warner, Streetcar Suburbs
Winchester
Arlington
Belmont
Newton
Melrose
Malden

Cleveland
Bratenahl
Cleveland Heights
East Cleveland
Euclid
Fairview Park
Lakewood
Rocky River
Shaker Heights was initially planned by the Van Sweringen brothers.  Known chiefly for their railroad interests, the brothers linked their community to Downtown Cleveland with their Shaker Heights Rapid Transit, which operates to this day.

Columbus
Bexley is the location of the Ohio Governor's Mansion, along with a number of other large Tudor and Colonial style mansions.
Grandview Heights  
Old Beechwold
Upper Arlington, specifically the original section south of Lane Avenue, was mapped out and developed around the Scioto Country Club, beginning just after WWI.

Dallas
 The neighborhood of Highland Park was mapped out specifically for such reasons, and attracted the wealthiest citizens of the city at the time.

Detroit
The Grosse Pointe neighbourhoods were conceived of in the early 1890s as a retreat for wealthy Detroit businessmen and families. A passenger rail line that connected Detroit to Mt. Clemens, along the coast, was operational by the late 1890s, passing through what would become Grosse Pointe, making the area more accessible.
Many of the neighborhoods of Detroit were built as streetcar suburbs. They are characterized by mostly single- and 2-family houses on 30 or 45-foot lots with a few townhouses and multifamily apartments scattered about. These include Springwells Village, Southwest Detroit, Michigan-Martin, Arden Park, and Boston–Edison.

Edmonton
The Glenora neighbourhood waited for 10 years before it developed, because it was waiting for the street car tracks to come to the area.  Instead of the edges of many cities at this time having infrequent streetcar service, Glenora was easily accessible via streetcar.

Houston
 The Houston Heights neighborhood was created in 1891 by millionaire Oscar Martin Carter and a group of investors who established the Omaha and South Texas Land Company. It was its own municipality until the City of Houston annexed the Heights in 1919.
 Neartown was originally envisioned as a planned community and streetcar suburb dating back to the early 20th century before the development of River Oaks by developer J. W. Link and his Houston Land Corporation. Link built his own home in Montrose, known as the Link-Lee Mansion, which is now part of the University of St. Thomas campus.

Indianapolis
Irvington, founded in 1870 five miles (8 km) east of downtown Indianapolis, prospered as a streetcar suburb in the 1890s, leading to Indianapolis annexing the community in 1902.
 Riverside, founded in 1902 three-and-a-half miles (5.6 km) northwest of downtown Indianapolis, was developed in the style of the City Beautiful movement with tree-lined streets, landscaped medians/traffic circles, generous setbacks, and glacier boulder retaining walls.

Jacksonville
The combined Riverside and Avondale  neighborhoods were served by streetcar lines starting in 1887 until the 1930s, with ridership peaking at over 13 million riders in 1913.

Knoxville
Fourth and Gill, established in the 1880s, still contains most of its original houses and streetscapes.
Oakwood, Knoxville, was studied as an example of a working-class, as opposed to middle-class, streetcar suburb.
Old North Knoxville, established as a separate town in the 1880s.

Los Angeles
Angelino Heights, built around the Temple Street horsecar (later upgraded to electric streetcar as part of the Los Angeles Railway Yellow Car system), was the first suburban development outside of downtown Los Angeles.
Highland Park developed along the Figueroa Street trolley lines and railroads linking downtown Los Angeles and Pasadena. The old right-of-way was reopened in 2003 as part of the Los Angeles County Transit Authority Metro Gold Line light rail.
Leimert Park, a later streetcar suburb planned by the Olmsted Brothers firm, touted both its automobile accessibility and location along the 6 line of the Yellow Car.
Much of South Central Los Angeles first developed as streetcar suburbia, served by the Yellow Car's Vermont Avenue, Broadway, and Central Avenue lines.
Southeast Los Angeles, including the neighborhoods of Huntington Park and Walnut Park, also served by the Yellow Car lines. 
West Hollywood was marketed by developers in the late 19th and early 20th century for its proximity, by streetcar, both to downtown Los Angeles and Pacific Ocean beaches.

Miami
Miami's Coral Gables neighborhoods were built in the 1920s as the earliest suburbs of Downtown Miami by early Miami developers. Coral Gables was connected to Downtown, by a series of streetcars down Coral Way. Today, Coral Gables homes are some of the most expensive single-family homes in Miami, as the vast majority of them have been preserved since the 1920s. Within Coral Gables, Miracle Mile has urbanized over the decades, becoming a dense, urban neighborhood with numerous high rise apartment and office towers.

Milwaukee
Shorewood was served by the numbers 10 and 15 streetcars on the north side until the mid-1950s, when it was converted to bus.
Whitefish Bay was served by the number 15 streetcar on the north side until the mid-1950s, when it was converted to bus.
Cudahy was served by the 15 and 16 streetcars on the south side.
South Milwaukee was served by the 15 and 16 streetcars on the south side.
Wauwatosa was served by the 10, 16 and 17 streetcars on the west side.
West Allis was served by the 10, 18 and 19 streetcars on the west side.

Montreal

Most of Montreal's streetcar suburbs feature a mix of attached red-brick or greystone duplexes, triplexes, fourplexes and multiplexes with exterior staircases instead of narrow-lot single-family homes. These areas usually feature a vibrant main street, usually the one where the trams traversed, that contains most of the shops, businesses and services, while smaller dépanneurs (Convenience stores) line the intersections of the smaller residential streets.

Park-Extension: Tramways 80 & 95
Hochelaga-Maisonneuve: Tramways 84,87, 3, 5 & 22
Rosemont: Tramways 7,52 & 54
Verdun: Tramways 25 & 58
Notre-Dame-de-Grâce: Tramways 70, 83, 3 & 31
Villeray: Tramways 24, 35 & 72

Newark
Many communities in Essex County, New Jersey were served by the Public Service Railway lines that fed into the Newark City Subway and the Newark Public Service Terminal including Irvington, Maplewood, Montclair, Bloomfield, Glen Ridge and The Oranges. Some of these routes remain today as NJ Transit Bus routes including the 21, 25, 27, 29 and 39.

Omaha
Soon after the city's founding in 1856, many different companies provided horse-drawn cars, streetcars and eventually busing throughout the city. Streetcar service stopped on March 4, 1955. Some of the communities served exclusively as streetcar suburbs included:
 Kountze Place
 Dundee
 Benson
 South Omaha

Ottawa
 After the Bank St. streetcar to Lansdowne Park was installed, the Glebe began attracting upper-middle class residents, particularly those whose homes were destroyed in the Great Fire of 1900.
 The extension of the streetcar system along Richmond Road from Rochesterville to Britannia Park created the streetcar suburbs of Hintonburg, Westboro and Britannia Village.

Philadelphia
Aldan
Camden
Cheltenham
Clifton Heights
Collingdale
Collingswood
Darby
Haddonfield
Media
Merchantville
Millbourne
Norristown
Sharon Hill
Springfield (Delco)
Upper Darby
West Philadelphia Streetcar Suburb Historic District

Phoenix
The F. Q. Story Neighborhood Historic District was developed in the 1920s as one of Phoenix's streetcar suburbs.

Piedmont
 Piedmont, California real estate developments and the Key System (or Key Route) street car lines were built and managed by Francis Marion Smith and Frank Colton Havens.

Pittsburgh

Many of Pittsburgh's more affluent areas began as streetcar suburbs, including Friendship, Highland Park, Squirrel Hill, and Regent Square, primarily residential neighborhoods located east of the city's center. Outside city limits, the construction of streetcar tracks caused communities such as Edgewood, Sewickley, and Aspinwall to become heavily developed sanctuaries for the city's upper middle class.
The T light rail, Pittsburgh's only current rail transit, encompasses former streetcar lines and connects the streetcar suburbs of Dormont, Mt. Lebanon, and Castle Shannon. Although the communities at the end of the line (Bethel Park and South Park) are mainly 1940s-60s automobile-dependent suburbs, some neighborhoods within them near the rail line reflect the character of streetcar communities, such as the neighborhood of Library.
 A streetcar in Pittsburgh also is known as a "trolley," and Mister Rogers' Neighborhood, a children's public television show (1968-2001) originating in Pittsburgh, used a toy trolley as transition between reality and a "Neighborhood of Make-Believe" show segment, as trolleys would be familiar to local children in 1968.

Portland, Oregon
Lents was a separate community connected to Portland by streetcar when it was platted in 1892.
Laurelhurst was a planned community designed around the streetcar lines along Glisan Street.

Richmond, Virginia
Barton Heights
 Bellevue
Ginter Park
Hermitage
Laburnum Park
Highland Park
Highland Springs
Sherwood Park
Washington Park
Westover Hills
Woodland Heights

St. Louis
Maplewood a bedroom community established at the end of a streetcar line from St. Louis. An early suburb of the city, touted for its fresh air in an era when St. Louis tended to have high smog levels from coal burning.
University City formed in 1903, at the end of St. Louis' streetcar line to that area. One year before the 1904 World's Fair, which was held nearby in Forest Park, spurred further development. A prominent area in University City is known as "the Loop" to this day, a reference to the streetcar lines which ended in a turnaround loop near the town hall.  The Loop Trolley, a new historic streetcar line was built in this area. (2018).

Salt Lake City
Sugar House is a neighborhood southeast of downtown Salt Lake City. It was originally established in 1853, however, saw its biggest expansion upon the completion of the Salt Lake City streetcar system. It was originally isolated from the region, as much of the city's growth took place in and around downtown Salt Lake. But after the Utah Prison moved to the area and retail development took over 2100 South it become one of the most active areas of the city. Today it is home to SugarHouse Park, Westminster College, and a revived downtown area filled with mostly local and regional businesses. A modern streetcar line, the S-Line, was opened in 2013 by the city and the Utah Transit Authority, with plans to build a whole streetcar "Park" and modern transit-oriented development.

San Jose
 Hanchett Residence Park was San Jose's first streetcar suburb.  It was built in 1907 by Lewis E. Hanchett, who connected his streetcar system directly into the neighborhood using formal entrance gates, separate automobile entrances, and two of the earliest roundabout traffic circles built in America. The layout was designed by famed San Francisco Golden Gate Park designer John McLaren. San Jose's Alum Rock Park and Venodome Hotel were also on different spurs of the streetcar line connecting downtown.
 Willow Glen was originally an independent town, until it voted to be annexed by San Jose in 1936. The Southern Pacific Railroad operated the Peninsular Rail line, which ran “Big Red Cars” down Bird, to Coe, to Lincoln, with a turn at Willow Street, then to Meridian Avenue. Southern Pacific lost money on the Peninsular Rail line from about 1918. It covered areas out to Saratoga and elsewhere. When the 1930s depression arrived,

Seattle
 Columbia City was established as an independent town in 1891 along the Rainier Avenue Electric Railway.
 Eastlake
 Ravenna was established adjacent to Ravenna Park after a streetcar line was built by the Rainier Power and Railway Company in 1891.
 Wallingford
Alaska Junction (West Seattle)

Toronto

West Hill, Cliffside, Birch Cliff, Riverdale, The Beaches, North Toronto, Parkdale, New Toronto, Mimico and Long Branch are all streetcar suburbs. The Scarborough neighbourhoods of West Hill and Cliffside lost their radial streetcar service in 1936. Birch Cliff lost its streetcar service in 1954. Streetcar service was also provided far outside of the modern Toronto areas as interurbans, into Port Credit west of Long Branch on the lakefront, which is now part of the city of Mississauga.

Washington, D.C.

During the late-1800s, streetcars spurred development in numerous villages in Washington County, D.C., including Brightwood, Mount Pleasant, Tenleytown, Chevy Chase, LeDroit Park, Uniontown, and Brookland. All lost streetcar service by the mid-1960s.

From the late 1880s to the end of the streetcar era, transit lines spread out of Washington and into the surrounding areas of Montgomery and Prince George's counties in Maryland, heading out to Rockville, Forest Glen, Kensington, Takoma Park, and Berwyn Heights. In particular, the streetcar helped shape the development of the Gateway Arts District from Mount Rainier through Hyattsville and Riverdale Park and beyond through College Park to Laurel.

Australasia

Kelburn in New Zealand is served by the Wellington Cable Car, and Karori transport once linked to it.

The inner suburbs of many Australian cities were planned around tram lines.  Melbourne's existing extensive tram network includes some examples of existing tram suburbs where tram was the dominant form of early transportation and still a major form of transport, including Carlton, Fitzroy, St Kilda, Albert Park, South Melbourne, and Brunswick.

Old World 

In the Old World, many residential neighborhoods were developed in the early days of industrial urbanization before electric streetcars/trams were invented.  However, in much of Europe tram systems eventually came to play a much larger role in public transportation than in most of the New World.  Here, therefore, the term "streetcar suburb" is not needed as distinct concept as most neighborhoods in many European cities are tram-oriented, especially in those countries which still had a lower rate of private automobile ownership in the 20th century, such as in the former Soviet Union.

An example is the city of Prague, the capital of the Czech Republic.  Prague has built many new suburban roads since the fall of communism and also has an extensive metro and bus system, but because its central core is a UNESCO World Heritage Site, the city authorities limit new road construction in historic areas.  Instead the tram system is the backbone of the transportation system, with many pre-communist and communist-era neighborhoods featuring brick and plaster walk-up apartment buildings lining roads that are served by several tram routes which run into the centre of the city.  This is broadly similar to many mid-sized European cities.

As housing was scarce in much of the Eastern bloc, new construction mostly occurred in the Plattenbau/Panelák style and new neighborhoods were planned from the outset with a tram connection to enable easy commuting. Examples include the planned developments of Berlin Marzahn, Halle-Neustadt or Dresden-Gorbitz. In the west, streetcars had lost much of their importance so similar neighborhoods were built along much more car-dependent lines or - in the case of Nürnberg Langwasser - with a new subway that was built from Langwasser inwards to link the new neighborhoods to jobs and shopping in downtown Nuremberg.

See also 
 New Urbanism
 Transit-oriented development
 Metro-Land
 Interurban
 Commuter town
 Transit village
Commuter rail
Railway town

References 

 
Human habitats